Ronald R. Foster (February 19, 1930 – February 26, 2015) was an American actor.

Partial filmography

The Proud and Profane (1956) - Bolton (uncredited)
The Storm Rider (1957) - Burns (uncredited)
Under Fire (1957) - Lieutenant (uncredited)
Young and Dangerous (1957) - Rock's Buddy (uncredited)
Rockabilly Baby (1957) - Carnival Barker (uncredited)
Cattle Empire (1958) - Stitch (uncredited)
Thundering Jets (1958) - Control Tower Sergeant (uncredited)
Desert Hell (1958) - Pvt. Bergstrom
Diary of a High School Bride (1959) - Steve
Ma Barker's Killer Brood (1960) - Doc
Three Came to Kill (1960) - Herb Morely (uncredited)
The Music Box Kid (1960) - Larry Shaw
Cage of Evil (1960) - Det. Scott Harper 
The Walking Target (1960) - Nick Harbin
Operation Bottleneck (1961) - Lt. Rulan H. Voss
Secret of Deep Harbor (1961) - Skip Hanlon
House of the Dammed (1963) - Scott Campbell
Private Lessons (1981) - Fillmore
The Muppets Take Manhattan (1984) - Man in Winesop's Office
Ninja III: The Domination (1984) - Jiminez
The Money Pit (1986) - Record Producer
Legal Eagles (1986) - Reporter #3

Other television roles

 Highway Patrol (1957-1959) Officer Garvey / Dispatcher / Officer / Officer 1410 / Officer 3220 / Officer Dennis / Officer Dorsey / Officer Foster / Officer Garvey - Unit 2108 / Plainclothes Officer / Sgt. Garvey / Unit 2174 / Unit 2370 / Unit 3110 (24 episodes)
Official Detective "Murder In A Girls' School" - Miller Dolce (1958)
 Peter Gunn "Murder on the Midway" - Martin Franklin (1958)
Perry Mason as Fred Pike in "The Case of the Prudent Prosecutor" (1960) loop
The Life and Legend of Wyatt Earp as Johnny in "Arizona Lottery" (1960)
Sea Hunt, twice (1959–1960, Season 3, Episode 18)
Colt .45 as Tommy Potts in "Bounty List" (1960)
Checkmate as Bill in "The Mask of Vengeance" (1960)
Bat Masterson, twice as Toby Dawson in "Six Feet of Gold" (1960) and as Sheriff Buck Simpson in "Jeopardy at Jackson Hole" (1961)
Gunsmoke, twice (1961); once as Jim Garza in “Nina’s Revenge” (S7E12).
Tales of Wells Fargo as Ken Logan in "Royal Maroon" (1962)
Alcoa Premiere as Lieutenant Durham in "Seven Against the Sea" (1962)
Laramie as Lee Taylor in "The Wedding Party" (1963)
The Virginian as Charlie Dorsey in "The Money Cage" (1963)
G.E. True as Captain James Dunlop in "Black Market" (1963)
The Outer Limits as Dr. Robert Richardson in "The Mice" (1964)
Kraft Suspense Theatre as Reverend Larson in "Portrait of an Unknown Man" (1964)
Combat! as Private Marshall in "Crossfire" (1965)
Twelve O'Clock High as Captain Borega in "Gauntlet of Fire" (1966)
Run for Your Life as Major Conway in "Rendezvous in Tokyo" (1967)
The High Chaparral as Lieutenant Corey in "The Peacemaker" (1968)
The Bill Cosby Show as Dr. Madeo in "Let X Equal a Lousy Weekend" (1969)
O'Hara, U.S. Treasury as Al Ellis in "Operation Crystal Springs" (1970)
Petrocelli, twice (1974 and 1976)
Dynasty, as a sheriff in "Colorado Roulette" (1988)
The Cosby Show, twice (1987 and 1991)
Law & Order as Charles Jefferson in "Everybody's Favorite Bagman" (1990)
The Twilight Zone, Season 5. Episode 10, “The 7th Is Made Up of Phantoms", Tank Commander MSG Conners, 1963

References

External links
 
 

1930 births
2015 deaths
American male television actors
American male film actors
American male soap opera actors
Male actors from Kansas
Actors from Wichita, Kansas
Male actors from Los Angeles